Oscar Munoz (born January 5, 1959) is an American businessman and executive chairman of United Airlines. He previously served as chief executive officer (CEO) of United Airlines from 2015 to 2020. Prior to his role at United Airlines, Munoz served on the board of parent company United Continental Holdings (UCH) and held multiple executive positions at CSX Corporation and AT&T.

In December 2019, Munoz announced that he would transition to the role of executive chairman of the board in May 2020. President Scott Kirby took over the CEO role from Munoz in May 2020 at United's annual meeting.

Early life
Munoz was born on January 5, 1959, the eldest of ten children in a Mexican-American family from Southern California. He was the first in his family to graduate from college. Munoz earned a BS in business from the University of Southern California in 1982, and an MBA from Pepperdine University.

Career
Munoz began his career holding various financial positions at PepsiCo, afterwards serving as regional vice president of finance and administration for The Coca-Cola Company. 

Munoz served as CFO for US West beginning in 1999. When the company merged with Qwest in 2000, he served as vice president of finance for the combined company until 2001. From 2001 to 2003, he served as the chief financial officer and vice president of consumer services at AT&T. 

He joined the CSX Corporation in 2003 as chief financial officer and chief of strategy. In 2012, he was promoted to chief operating officer of CSX, a role which he held until 2015, when he was named president of the company. During his tenure as chief operating officer, Munoz was responsible for keeping trains running on time. In mid-2015, Munoz was appointed as the next CEO of CSX, officially slated to start in the position at the end of the year, before leaving the company in September 2015 to become CEO of United Airlines.

Munoz was named CEO of United Airlines on September 8, 2015, succeeding Jeff Smisek. At the time of this appointment, Munoz had served as a member of the board of directors of United's parent company, United Continental Holdings (UCH), since its formation in 2004.

After becoming CEO of United Airlines, Munoz embarked on a "listening tour" of the company, meeting with disgruntled employees around the United States and discussing their concerns. While this phase was intended to last for the first 90 days of the job, Munoz was hospitalized after having a heart attack in October 2015, 38 days into the job.

In 2015, five years after the merger of Continental and United, staff remained on separate labor contracts and were only allowed to fly on the routes and planes for the company where they were employed before the merger, causing contentions between management and labor. Under Munoz's tenure, five-year contracts for flight attendants were approved within four months, after years of negotiations. By the end of 2016, all union labor contracts were renegotiated. Although pilots were unable to reach a joint labor agreement in 2012, United agreed to a two-year contract extension with the pilots' union in 2016, under Munoz, allowing pilots to retain some of the pay and benefits that were cut after the September 11 attacks. On August 29, 2016, Munoz hired Scott Kirby, then-president of American Airlines, to fill the same role at United.

In 2015, Munoz was one of two Hispanic CEOs in the top 100 of the Fortune 500 list. Munoz has been named among the "100 Most Influential Hispanics" by Hispanic Business magazine. In March 2017, Munoz was named "Communicator of the Year for 2017" by PRWeek.

The following month, Munoz received widespread criticism for his handling of the issues after a ticketed passenger was forcibly removed from United Airlines Flight 3411. In an email to United employees, Munoz initially stated that he stood behind employees for having "followed established procedures" and said that Dao was "disruptive and belligerent." In a second press release on April 11, which was more sensitive to public opinion, Munoz stated in the press release "I apologize for having to re-accommodate these customers." Munoz's handling of the incident was described by various critics as a "fumbling response," a "major disappointment," and a "sort of a self-immolation [that] makes you wonder about his choice as CEO." Munoz was already under pressure from activist shareholders to improve United's performance, including its customer relations, after he took charge of the airline in 2015. After the incident, Steve Barrett, editor-in-chief of PRWeek US, stated "if PRWeek was choosing its Communicator of the Year now, we would not be awarding it to Oscar Munoz … In time, the episode and subsequent response will be quoted in textbooks as an example of how not to respond in a crisis." Subsequently, on April 21, 2017, UCH announced that Munoz would remain chief executive officer of the airlines but would "not take broader control of the company as previously planned." Munoz had been scheduled to assume the role of chairman of the board of UCH at the company's 2018 annual stockholders' meeting.

In December 2019, it was announced that Munoz would transition to the role of executive chairman of the board in May 2020. Then President Scott Kirby took over the CEO role from Munoz in May 2020 at United's annual meeting. Munoz was positioned to serve a one-year term as chairman of United Airlines Holdings, succeeding retired Jane Garvey.

On May 27, 2021, it was announced that Edward "Ted" Philip would succeed Munoz as non-executive chairman of United Airlines Holdings, Inc.

Munoz has also served on University of North Florida's board of trustees and the PAFA advisory board of Vanderbilt University. Munoz is a voting member of the University of Southern California Board of Trustees, where he serves as co-chair of the Finance and Campus Planning Committee.

Personal life
Munoz is married; he and his wife have four children.  Munoz is also an avid cyclist and has run in marathons.

Philanthropy
In 2011, the couple gave $100,000 to the University of North Florida to fund a scholarship for students who are the first in their family to attend college. The same year, the couple donated $1 million to a middle school in Florida to fund a dropout prevention program.

Health
Munoz suffered a heart attack on October 15, 2015, a month after he assumed the position of CEO of United Airlines. As he awaited a heart transplant, Munoz interviewed candidates for top management jobs in his apartment while connected to machines that kept his heart functioning. On January 5, 2016, he received a heart transplant and returned to work in March 2016. Munoz is one of few CEOs to continue in the position after receiving a heart transplant. He has spoken publicly about his vegan diet and has since transitioned to what he refers to as a "flexitarian" diet after his heart transplant.

References

External links

|-

1959 births
American chairpersons of corporations
American airline chief executives
American chief operating officers
American people of Mexican descent
AT&T people
Businesspeople from California
Coca-Cola people
Living people
Marshall School of Business alumni
Pepperdine University alumni
PepsiCo people
United Airlines people
Place of birth missing (living people)